Perry Haddock (born 20 April 1959) is an Australian former rugby league footballer who played in the 1980s.

Professional career
He played three seasons with the Cronulla-Sutherland Sharks between 1981 and 1983, then switched to the St. George Dragons for three seasons between 1984 and 1986. He starred for Dragons during this period, and he played in the 1985 Grand Final.

In 1987, Haddock switched clubs again, this time to the Illawarra Steelers and stayed for two seasons.

Perry Haddock was one of the shortest halfbacks in modern day rugby league, standing at 1.67 metres, but he is remembered as one of the great club halfbacks of his era.

After retirement
Haddock coached the Dragons Jersey Flegg Cup team in the early 1990s. It was during this time that he developed Oztag.

References

1959 births
Living people
Australian rugby league players
Cronulla-Sutherland Sharks players
Illawarra Steelers players
Rugby league halfbacks
Rugby league players from New South Wales
St. George Dragons players